Fielden is an English surname. Notable people with it include:

Charlotte Fielden (born 1932), Canadian novelist, playwright, actress and therapist
Edward Brocklehurst Fielden (1857–1942), British businessman and Conservative Party politician
Edward Fielden (RAF officer), GCVO, CB, DFC, AFC, (1903–1976), Royal Air Force pilot and World War II veteran
Jamie Fielden (born 1978), English professional rugby league player for Keighley Cougars
John Fielden (1784–1849), British social reformer and benefactor
Joshua Fielden (politician) (1827–1887), British cotton manufacturer and Conservative politician
Louisa Fielden (born 1983), British film director, screenwriter and producer
Samuel Fielden (1847–1922), socialist, anarchist and labor activist convicted in the 1886 Haymarket bombing
Stuart Fielden (born 1979), English professional rugby league footballer for Bradford, Wigan and Huddersfield
Thomas Fielden (musician) (1883–1974), British pianist and music teacher
Thomas Fielden (politician) (1854–1897), British Conservative Party politician

See also
Fielden, Missouri
Fielden Chair of Pure Mathematics, endowed professorial position in the School of Mathematics, University of Manchester, England
Fielden Electronics, a UK former company

References

English-language surnames